Kollam is a city in Kerala, India.

It may also refer to:
 Kollam district, a district in Kerala
 Kollam (State Assembly constituency), a constituency in Kerala
 Kollam (Lok Sabha constituency)
 Kollam Port, a port in Kerala
 Kollam Beach, a beach in Kerala
 Kollam Bypass, a part of NH 66 that bypasses CBD of Kollam city in Kerala, India
 Kollam Era or Malayalam Calendar, a solar and sidereal Hindu calendar used in Kerala
 Kollam Municipal Corporation (KMC), a certified civic body that governs the City of Kollam in the Indian state of Kerala
 Kollam Metropolitan Area, one of the 7 urban agglomerations in Kerala
 Kollam Development Authority (KDA), an autonomous body for the development of Kollam Metropolitan Area

It is also a given name and surname and may refer to:
 Kollam Thulasi, Indian actor in Malayalam cinema
 Kollam G. K. Pillai, Indian film actor in Malayalam cinema
Ajith Kollam (1962–2018), Indian film actor, who predominantly appeared in Malayalam cinema